Protomelas pleurotaenia is a species of cichlid endemic to Lake Malawi where it is only known from Monkey Bay and Nkhata Bay where it is known to occur from the surface to .  This species can reach a length of  TL.  This species can also be found in the aquarium trade.

References

pleurotaenia
Fish described in 1901
Taxonomy articles created by Polbot